Cameron Edwards Perkins (born September 27, 1990) is an American former professional baseball outfielder. He previously played in Major League Baseball (MLB) for the Philadelphia Phillies. He was born in Beaumont, Texas, and played at Southport High School where he was drafted by the Seattle Mariners. Subsequently, he attended Purdue University, and excelled playing baseball there before the Philadelphia Phillies drafted him in 2012. While making his way through the minor leagues, he was three-times named an all-star before earning an promotion to the Major League, making his major league debut in June 2017.

Amateur career
Perkins was born to parents Dale Perkins and Patti Boyett in Beaumont, Texas; he has four siblings. He attended Vidor High School, where he played for the varsity team his sophomore year. He also played football, basketball, and participated in track and field. As a junior, Perkins transferred to Southport High School, where he would live with his father.

Perkins was drafted by the Seattle Mariners in the 43rd round of the 2009 Major League Baseball Draft out of Southport High School in Indianapolis, Indiana. He did not sign and played college baseball at Purdue University from 2010 to 2012.

Professional career

Philadelphia Phillies
Perkins was drafted by the Philadelphia Phillies in the sixth round of the 2012 Major League Baseball Draft. He signed with the Phillies and made his professional debut with the Gulf Coast Phillies and also played for the Williamsport Crosscutters. Perkins played for the Clearwater Threshers in 2013. He started 2014 with the Double-A Reading Fightin Phils and was promoted to the Triple-A Lehigh Valley IronPigs in June.

Perkins started 2017 with the Lehigh Valley IronPigs and was called up to the Phillies on June 20, making his MLB debut later that same day.

Seattle Mariners
The Seattle Mariners claimed Perkins off waivers from the Phillies on December 11, 2017. He elected free agency on November 2, 2018.

Los Angeles Dodgers
In January 2019, Perkins signed a minor league contract with the Los Angeles Dodgers. He became a free agent at the end of the season.

Sugar Land Skeeters
On February 25, 2020, Perkins signed with the Sugar Land Skeeters of the Atlantic League of Professional Baseball. He did not play a game for the team due to the cancellation of the ALPB season because of the COVID-19 pandemic and became a free agent after the year.

References

External links

Purdue Boilermakers bio

1990 births
Living people
Baseball players from Indianapolis
Major League Baseball outfielders
Philadelphia Phillies players
Purdue Boilermakers baseball players
Florida Complex League Phillies players
Williamsport Crosscutters players
Clearwater Threshers players
Peoria Javelinas players
Reading Fightin Phils players
Lehigh Valley IronPigs players
Tiburones de La Guaira players
American expatriate baseball players in Venezuela
Gigantes del Cibao players
American expatriate baseball players in the Dominican Republic
Tacoma Rainiers players
Everett AquaSox players
Oklahoma City Dodgers players
Waterloo Bucks players